The Abbey Light Railway was a  narrow gauge railway in Kirkstall, Leeds, West Yorkshire, England.
Built by enthusiasts, the Railway ran from the nearby Bridge Road commercial area into the grounds of Kirkstall Abbey, operating most Sundays.

History 
In 1974, local engineer and lecturer at Kitson College Peter Lowe applied for planning permission to build a railway at Kirkstall.

From 1976, the line was built from scratch by a group of local enthusiasts, most of whom were members of the Ffestiniog Railway.

Initially the line ran purely as a private railway, but in 1986 it received permission to start public passenger services. These ran from Spring to Autumn, every Sunday and most Bank Holidays. The highlight of the year was the weekend Kirkstall Festival.

In 2006 plans were made to extend the line to the Armley Mills Industrial Museum nearby.  This would have involved crossing both the River Aire and the Leeds and Liverpool Canal. The project was never realised.

After Peter Lowe died in October 2012, the railway closed. Proposed to reopen in the Spring, without its Chief Engineer insurance became difficult to secure. The decision was reluctantly made by his widow to sell off the rolling stock and infrastructure. All but one of the locomotives and much other material was sold to the Welsh Highland Heritage Railway in Porthmadog, with work to dismantle the railway beginning in February 2013.

Locomotives

See also
 British narrow gauge railways

References

External links

Details of Railway
Film clips of the railway These were taken some time ago on 8 mm and include a film of some of the construction.

Transport in Leeds
2 ft gauge railways in England
Heritage railways in Yorkshire
Rail transport in West Yorkshire
History of Leeds
Railway lines opened in 1976
Railway lines closed in 2013
Closed railway lines in Yorkshire and the Humber
Kirkstall